German submarine U-652 was a Type VIIC U-boat of Nazi Germany's Kriegsmarine during World War II. The submarine was laid down on 5 February 1940 at the Howaldtswerke yard at Hamburg, launched on 7 February 1941, and commissioned on 3 April 1941 under the command of Oberleutnant zur See Georg-Werner Fraatz.

Attached to 3rd U-boat Flotilla based at Kiel, U-652 completed her training period on 30 June 1941 and was assigned to front-line service. In September 1941 she was involved in the "Greer Incident", attacking and being counter-attacked by the supposedly neutral American destroyer , an incident that brought the United States closer to war with Germany. As a direct result of the Greer incident the US President Franklin D. Roosevelt gave a speech on 11 September 1941 in which he confirmed that all US ships had been ordered to shoot on sight at all Axis ships and submarines in the Battle of the Atlantic. U-652 was transferred to 29th U-boat Flotilla based at La Spezia, Italy on 1 January 1942. She was scuttled on 2 June 1942.

Design
German Type VIIC submarines were preceded by the shorter Type VIIB submarines. U-652 had a displacement of  when at the surface and  while submerged. She had two shafts and two  propellers.

U-652 was fitted with five  torpedo tubes (four fitted at the bow and one at the stern), fourteen torpedoes, one  SK C/35 naval gun, 220 rounds, and a  C/30 anti-aircraft gun. The boat had a complement of between 44 and 60.

Service history

First patrol
U-652 left Kiel on 19 June 1941 and sailed to Bökfjord near Kirkenes, via Horten Naval Base and Trondheim, arriving on 22 July. Her first combat patrol began the next day, on 23 July, patrolling the coast of the Kola Peninsula. The 12 survivors from the crew of 57 were rescued by motorboats sent from the nearby coast. This was the first U-boat success in the Arctic Sea.

The U-boat returned to Kirkenes on 7 August after 16 days at sea, and after two days headed for Trondheim, arriving there on 13 August.

Second patrol
U-652 sailed from Trondheim on 23 August 1941 and headed out into the Atlantic waters between Greenland and Iceland.

As part of wolfpack Grönland, at 00:44 on 26 August the U-boat fired a spread of three torpedoes at a British naval convoy running south-south-east and observed a hit on the 10,917 GRT auxiliary minelayer , which soon came to a halt. Another torpedo was fired at the vessel at 00:53, but missed. The destroyers  and  sailed from Scapa Flow to assist the damaged ship and escorted her to The Minches. She was repaired at Belfast.

As part of wolfpack Markgraf, on 10 September at 04:52 U-652 fired two single torpedoes at ships of Convoy SC 42 north-east of Cape Farewell, and damaged two British ships. The 6,508 GRT tanker Tahchee caught fire and was abandoned. The crew later reboarded the vessel and managed to put out the fire.

The Greer incident
On 4 September 1941, off Iceland, the American destroyer  received a signal from a British bomber that a German submarine was in the vicinity. Greer made sonar contact, and pursued the U-652 at close range. The aircraft dropped four depth charges, and soon after the U-boat fired a torpedo at the US warship, perhaps believing she had launched the attack. Oblt.z.S. Fraatz also misidentified the destroyer as "one of the 50 American vessels that are now sailing for England". A two-hour battle ensued, during which Greer dropped 19 depth charges, and the U-boat fired another torpedo, without result. President Roosevelt used this event in his campaign to convince the US to go to war, and the "undeclared war" between U-boats and US escorts escalated dramatically.

U-652 arrived at Lorient, France, on 18 September after 27 days on patrol.

Third patrol
U-652 left Lorient on 1 November 1941, and headed out into the mid-Atlantic, before sailing through the Strait of Gibraltar into the Mediterranean Sea. There, south of the Balearic Islands, on 9 December she hit the 1,595 GRT Vichy French merchant ship Saint Denis with a single torpedo, which sank her immediately.

U-652 arrived at Messina on 12 December after 42 days at sea.

Fourth patrol
The U-boat departed Messina on 14 December 1941 and sailed around Greece into the Aegean Sea. There at 21:34 on 19 December she torpedoed the unescorted 6,557 GRT Soviet tanker Varlaam Avanesov, which sank two hours later 2.5 miles off Cape Babakale, Çanakkale Province, Turkey. The survivors abandoned ship in lifeboats, reached the Turkish coast and were later repatriated. The U-boat arrived at La Spezia on 1 January 1942, where she joined 29th U-boat Flotilla.

Fifth, sixth and seventh patrols
After sailing from La Spezia to Salamis in early February 1942, U-652 carried out two short and uneventful patrols.

Eighth patrol
Departing Salamis on 18 March 1942 U-652 headed for the coast of North Africa. There on 20 March at 10:54 she fired four torpedoes at the 1,050 tons British Type II   about 40 miles north-east of Bardia. One torpedo hit Heythrop, which was taken in tow by  towards Tobruk, but she foundered five hours later.

Two of the torpedoes struck the ship in the bows, and she caught fire and sank in a short time. From her complement of 246, only 53 survived.

U-652 arrived at Pola on 31 March 1942.

Ninth patrol
The U-boat left Pola on 25 May 1942 on her final patrol, and returned to the North African coast. There were no casualties from her crew of 46.

Summary of raiding history

References

Notes

Citations

Bibliography

External links

 Roosevelt's Fireside Chat 18: On The Greer Incident (11 September 1941) – Miller Center of Public Affairs (audio and transcript)

World War II submarines of Germany
German Type VIIC submarines
U-boats commissioned in 1941
U-boats sunk in 1942
World War II shipwrecks in the Mediterranean Sea
1941 ships
Ships built in Hamburg
U-boats scuttled in 1942
Maritime incidents in June 1942